Alavez is a surname. Notable people with the surname include:

Aleida Alavez Ruiz (born 1974), Mexican politician
Francita Alavez ( 1816– 1906), Texan heroine
Gilberto Alavez, Mexican Paralympic athlete